Peter David Arthur Garnsey,  (born 22 October 1938) is a retired classicist and academic. Born in Australia, where he studied classics at the University of Sydney as a member of St Paul’s College, he has spent most of his career at Cambridge. He was a fellow of Jesus College, Cambridge from 1974 to 2006, and a professor of the history of classical antiquity at the University of Cambridge from 1997 to 2006. His area of research concerns the history of political theory, intellectual history, social and economic history, food, famine and nutrition, and physical anthropology.

Bibliography

Books

 Social Status and Legal Privilege in the Roman Empire (1970). Oxford University Press.
 The Roman Empire: Society, Economy and Culture (1987)  London 1987. Co-author.
 Famine and Food Supply in the Graeco-Roman World (1988). Cambridge University Press.
 Ideas of Slavery from Aristotle to Augustine (1996). Cambridge University Press. 
 Cities, Peasants and Food (1998). Cambridge University Press. 
 Food and Society in Classical Antiquity (1999). Cambridge University Press. 
 Evolution of the late Antique World (2001). Cambridge University Press. Co-author.
 Lactantius, Divine Institutes. Introd/Transl./Notes (2003). Liverpool University Press. Co-author.
 Thinking about Property, antiquity to the age of revolution (2007). Cambridge University Press
 Cambridge Ancient History vols. XI (2000), XII (2005), XIII(1998). Co-editor

References

External links
Peter Garnsey Faculty of Classics homepage
Peter Garnsey homepage at Jesus College, Cambridge

1938 births
Living people
Alumni of the University of Oxford
University of Sydney alumni
Fellows of Jesus College, Cambridge
Fellows of the British Academy
Fellows of the Australian Academy of the Humanities
Historians of antiquity
People educated at Canberra Grammar School